The Church of St. Clare of Assisi is a parish church under the authority of the Roman Catholic Archdiocese of New York, located at Hone Avenue at Rhinelander Avenue in The Bronx, New York City. It was established in 1929 as a national parish for the Italian American community "at Paulding and Rhinelander Avenue, Morris Park or Williamsbridge."

Buildings
The church was built between 1929 and 1930 to the designs of Anthony J. DePace. "The rectory address is 1918 Paulding Ave., Bronx, NY 10462. The parish school is located at 1911 Hone Avenue, Bronx NY 10461. The school and rectory are back-to-back on parallel avenues (Hone and Paulding), but they seem to be in different zip codes or post office branches. With more than 500 students, the school appears to have two sections per grade."

References

Further reading
 Thomas J. Shelley, The Archdiocese of New York: the Bicentennial History, (Archdiocese of New York, 2007), p. 484.

External links
 Official website

Christian organizations established in 1929
Roman Catholic churches completed in 1930
Roman Catholic churches in the Bronx
Romanesque Revival church buildings in New York City
Anthony J. DePace church buildings
Italian-American Roman Catholic national parishes in the United States
Private middle schools in the Bronx
Catholic elementary schools in the Bronx
Morris Park, Bronx
20th-century Roman Catholic church buildings in the United States